Hebron Valley Grange No. 1103, also known as West Hebron Methodist Church, is a historic grange building  located in the hamlet of West Hebron, in the town of Hebron in Washington County, New York. It was originally built about 1839 as a Methodist meeting house on a site located 20 miles from its current location.  It was moved a second time prior to 1874.  In 1911, the building was purchased by a local Grange organization and used until December 1985.  The original building is a three-by-three-bay, 1-story heavy timber-frame building.  An addition was completed about 1874.

It was listed on the National Register of Historic Places in 2006.

References

Grange buildings on the National Register of Historic Places in New York (state)
Grange organizations and buildings in New York (state)
Religious buildings and structures completed in 1839
Buildings and structures in Washington County, New York
National Register of Historic Places in Washington County, New York